Lawrence School may refer to:

Lawrence School, Lovedale, school in Tamil Nadu, India
The Lawrence School, Sanawar, school in Himachal Pradesh, India
Lawrence School (Sagamore Hills, Ohio), school in United States

See also
Lawrence College Ghora Gali, school in Pakistan